A special election was held in  on October 9, 1798 to fill a vacancy caused by the death of John Swanwick (DR) on August 1, 1798.  The election was held on the same day as elections to the 6th Congress.

Election results

See also 
List of special elections to the United States House of Representatives
 United States House of Representatives elections, 1798 and 1799

References 

Pennsylvania 1798 01
Pennsylvania 1798 01
1798 01
Pennsylvania 01
United States House of Representatives 01
United States House of Representatives 1798 01